The Hryszko Brothers Building is a building located at 836 North Russell Street, in the historic Albina District of north Portland, Oregon, United States. It was established in 1905 by Polish immigrants as a meeting hall and aid station, later hosting meetings by the St. Stanislaus Catholic Church and the Polish Library. It is now operated by McMenamins under the name White Eagle Saloon & Hotel, or simply White Eagle. The building is listed on the National Register of Historic Places.

See also
 National Register of Historic Places listings in North Portland, Oregon

References

External links

 

1905 establishments in Oregon
Buildings and structures completed in 1905
Buildings designated early commercial in the National Register of Historic Places
Eliot, Portland, Oregon
National Register of Historic Places in Portland, Oregon
North Portland, Oregon
Portland Historic Landmarks